Gulella foliifera is a species of very small air-breathing land snails, terrestrial pulmonate gastropod mollusks in the family Streptaxidae.

This species is endemic to Tanzania.

References

Fauna of Tanzania
Gulella
Gastropods described in 1895
Taxonomy articles created by Polbot